Eduardo 'Edu' Moya Cantillo (born 3 January 1981 in Monesterio, Extremadura) is a retired Spanish footballer who played as a right-back.

External links

1981 births
Living people
People from Tentudía
Sportspeople from the Province of Badajoz
Spanish footballers
Footballers from Extremadura
Association football defenders
La Liga players
Segunda División players
Segunda División B players
Tercera División players
CF Extremadura footballers
RCD Mallorca players
CD Tenerife players
Recreativo de Huelva players
RC Celta de Vigo players
Hércules CF players
Xerez CD footballers
CP Cacereño players
Bolivian Primera División players
Club Bolívar players
FC Lusitanos players
Indian Super League players
Odisha FC players
Spanish expatriate footballers
Expatriate footballers in Norway
Expatriate footballers in Bolivia
Expatriate footballers in Andorra
Expatriate footballers in India
Spanish expatriate sportspeople in Norway
Spanish expatriate sportspeople in Bolivia
Spanish expatriate sportspeople in Andorra
Spanish expatriate sportspeople in India